William of Douglas (died c. 1214) was a medieval nobleman living in Clydesdale, an area under the control of the King of the Scots.

Enigmatic origins
The origins of William are uncertain, the first of the name of Douglas to appear on historic record. He appears as witness to a charter of Jocelin, Bishop of Glasgow in 1174 in favour of the monks of Kelso Abbey, at which time he was in possession of the Lands of Douglas. It seems he was the son of Theobald le Fleming (born 1120, Aldingham Manor, Lancashire, England died 1193, Douglasdale, Midlothian, Scotland) and his wife, the sister of Freskin de Kersdale (of Moray).

Sholto/William
David Hume of Godscroft in his history refers to the progenitor of the House of Douglas, Sholto. Gleaned from the works of Buchanan and Boece, Godscroft's narrative explains that during the reign of a King Solvathius, Sholto Douglas was instrumental in putting down an uprising by a usurper Donald Bain in 767AD, and as reward was granted the lands that would after be called Douglas.

Both Balfour Paul and Maxwell agree that this origin tale is mythic, but do contest that William of Douglas was active at the time of the real rebellion of the Meic Uilleim, under their chief Domnall mac Uilleim. The earlier historians may have confused the mythic Donald Bain with Domnall Bán mac Domnaill, the penultimate Meic Uilleim chief.

This may be corroborated by the facts that the lands of Douglas marched with those of the leader of King William I of Scotland's retaliatory forces, Lochlann, Lord of Galloway. William may well have been a vassal of the Lord of Galloway. Furthermore, all of William's sons with the exception of the eldest were to hold privileged ecclesiastic positions within the former Meic Uilleim territories in Moray.

Although William de Douglas was the first known owner of Douglasdale, holding that land between 1174 and 1213, there is no reason to doubt that his father was "Theobaldo Flamatico" or Theobald the Fleming. The family's arms indicate the kinship with Murray and a descent like that of Brodie and Innes, from a third son of the house of Boulogne. In Flanders, there was a family of the Theobalds who were hereditary castellans of Ypres between about 1060 and 1127, after which their history becomes obscure. Theobald's lands in Scotland were granted to him soon after 1150 by the Abbot of Kelso. William de Douglas, the heir, having married the sister of Friskin de Kerdale or Freskin of Moray, had by her six sons; the five younger of them all went to Moray to support their uncle there and his own heir, Archenbald, stayed in Lanarkshire to inherit the Douglas estates. Archenbald married a daughter of Sir John Crawford.

Issue
William of Douglas may have married Margaret, a sister of Freskin of Kerdal, a Flemish laird from Moray. He had issue:

Archibald I (1166-1213), Lord of Douglas, married Margaret, daughter of Sir John Crawford of Crawford
Bricius de Douglas (ca. 1195–1222), Bishop of Moray
Alexander de Douglas (ca. 1195–1238), a canon of Spynie, vicar capitular of Elgin
Henry de Douglas (ca. 1195–1245), a canon of Spynie
Hugh de Douglas (ca. 1171–1245), a canon of Spynie, Archdeacon of Moray
Freskin de Douglas (1205-September 1232), parson of Douglas, later Dean of Moray
Margaret de Douglas (1177-1260), married Hervey de Keith, Marischal of Scotland

References

Notes

Sources

Liber S. Marie de Calchou, Registrum Cartarum Abbacie Tironensis de Kelso ii vols, ed. Innes. Bannatyne Club. Edinburgh 1846. 
Balfour Paul, Sir James, Scots Peerage IX vols. Edinburgh 1907
Fraser, Sir William. The Douglas Book IV Vols. Edinburgh 1885
Hume of Godscroft, David, A History of the House and Race of Douglas and Angus. London 1820 
Maxwell, Sir Herbert, A History of the House of Douglas II vols. London 1902 

Stirnet: Douglas01

12th-century births
1210s deaths
Scoto-Normans
William 01, Lord of Douglas

Year of birth unknown
Year of death uncertain